The Green Flash Handicap is a Grade III American Thoroughbred horse race for thoroughbreds three years old and older, over a distance of five furlongs on the turf held annually in August at Del Mar Racetrack in Del Mar, California.  The event currently carries a purse of $150,000.

History

The race was inaugurated in 2003 as a Listed event.

In 2014 the event was moved to the All Weather Track.

The event was upgraded to a Grade III event in 2019.

Records
Speed record: 
54.75 - Fast Parade (2006)

Margins: 
  lengths – Fast Parade (2006)

 Most wins
 2 -  California Flag (2009, 2010)
 2 -  Lieutenant Dan (2021, 2022)
 
Most wins by a jockey
 3 - Joseph Talamo (2009, 2011, 2019)

Most wins by a trainer
 3 - Brian J. Koriner (2009, 2010, 2019)

Most wins by an owner
 2 -  Hi Card Ranch (2009, 2010)
 2 -  Nicholas B. Alexander (2021, 2022)

Winners

Legend:

References

Graded stakes races in the United States
2003 establishments in California
Recurring sporting events established in 2003
Horse races in California
Flat horse races for three-year-old fillies
Grade 3 stakes races in the United States